Derrel Osbon Thomas (born January 14, 1951) is an American former professional baseball player and manager. Thomas was a member of the 1981 World Series winning Los Angeles Dodgers team. He played every defensive position except pitcher at least once in his career. After his Major League career, Thomas became a minor league manager.

Early life
Thomas attended Susan Miller Dorsey High School in Los Angeles. The school was the alma mater of a number of major-league players, including Sparky Anderson, Chili Davis and Don Buford. The Houston Astros made Thomas the first overall pick in the January 1969 MLB draft. He played 69 games between two teams in the Astros system that year, batting a career-high .302. By 1971, Thomas had made his major-league debut, playing six games for the Astros.

Career
In a major-league career that lasted through 1985, Thomas played for eight teams, mostly on the West Coast. In one of his best seasons, he hit .276 for the 1975 San Francisco Giants, collecting 48 runs batted in and 28 stolen bases, both career highs.

He was traded along with Bill Greif and Mark Schaeffer from the Astros to the San Diego Padres for Dave Roberts on December 3, 1971. He was dealt from the Padres to the Giants for Tito Fuentes and Butch Metzger at the Winter Meetings on December 6, 1974. 

Thomas said that he was often immature and unable to deal with the stressors of the game. Dusty Baker became fond of Thomas while they played for the Dodgers, but many people in baseball found Thomas to be an agitator. "Let's put it this way: Derrel Thomas does things that make it easy to hate him," Dodgers teammate Reggie Smith said. Padres manager Roger Craig said Thomas "plays hard and he's a showman-type player... If he has to play the villain role to get attention, he'll do it." After the 1985 season, Thomas' name was brought up in the Pittsburgh drug trials. Though he was not suspended, he was unable to find another major-league team to sign with. He signed with an independent team, the San Jose Bees, but he did not fit in well with his teammates and he was cut before the 1986 season started.

Following his playing career, Thomas briefly coached at Los Angeles City College and was the first manager of the Boise Hawks in 1987, then an independent team in the Class A-Short Season Northwest League. In June of that year, the Hawks faced the Bend Bucks, managed by Mel Roberts, marking the first time outside of Negro league baseball that two black managers faced each other in a professional regular-season game.

Thomas was fired during his first season in Boise. By 1988, he was managing a bar and coaching baseball at Leuzinger High School in Lawndale, California. Before a 1989 game, several players were late for the team bus, and though the players drove to their game, he would not allow them to play. Several players quit the team in protest and Thomas resigned.

In December 1991, Thomas was hired as a baseball coach at Dorsey High School. In March, a Dorsey baseball player fatally shot himself on the team bus while playing Russian roulette. Thomas was arrested the next month for attempting to purchase  of cocaine. He was placed on probation; his probation was extended after a 1997 drug possession arrest.

As of 2009, he was a member of the Los Angeles Dodgers organization serving as a representative of the Dodgers Legend Bureau.

References

External links

Venezuelan Winter League
Los Angeles Times – Articles on Derrel Thomas

1951 births
Living people
African-American baseball players
African-American baseball managers
American expatriate baseball players in Canada
American expatriate baseball players in Mexico
Baseball players from California
California Angels players
Cocoa Astros players
Columbus Astros players
Ganaderos de Tabasco players
Gold Coast Suns (baseball) players
Hawaii Islanders players
Houston Astros players
Los Angeles Dodgers Legend Bureau
Los Angeles Dodgers players
Major League Baseball center fielders
Major League Baseball second basemen
Major League Baseball shortstops
Miami Marlins (FSL) players
Minor league baseball managers
Montreal Expos players
Oklahoma City 89ers players
Philadelphia Phillies players
San Bernardino Pride players
San Diego Padres players
San Francisco Giants players
Tiburones de La Guaira players
American expatriate baseball players in Venezuela
Susan Miller Dorsey High School alumni
21st-century African-American people
20th-century African-American sportspeople